Sir Elias George Kulukundis OBE (20 April 1932 – 17 February 2021) was a member of a Greek shipping family whose professional career spanned shipping and the theatre. He was married to British actress Susan Hampshire.

Early life
Elias George Kulukundis was born on 20 April 1932 at 26 Warbeck Street in London, the son of a Greek shipping family who had made their home in London. His parents moved to New York City when he was eight. Kulukundis was not an active sportsman and took the role of statistician, keeping score. He attended Salisbury School until 1950, and was an Emeritus Trustee of the school.  He changed his name by deed poll to Eddie Kulukundis on 23 September 1993.

Career

Shipping
The Kulukundis and Mavroleon families had formed the shipping company London & Overseas Freighters (LOF) in 1948. Kulukundis entered the shipping industry by working on tramp steamers in the Mediterranean. After the death of his uncle John Kulukundis in September 1978, Kulukundis joined the LOF board. The company suffered mounting losses, and after it had sold all but two of its ships and all shoreside assets, he resigned on 11 December 1985.

He rejoined the board of the much-reduced company in 1988 following the death of company president Manuel Kulukundis, and also the death of his nephew, Minas Kulukundis, in the Lockerbie air disaster while flying to attend the funeral of his uncle and godfather Captain Nicholas Kulukundis.

On 1 November 1997, LOF was sold to Frontline Freighters AB of Sweden and Kulukundis resigned from the board. He continued to hold positions with family company Company Rethymnis and Kulukundis Ltd, which celebrated its 150th anniversary in 1998.

Theatre
A theatre impresario, Kulukundis started producing plays while resident in the United States. He co-produced the 1976 Tony Award-winning play Travesties by Tom Stoppard. Kulukundis later formed Knightsbridge Productions, with theatre artist/educator Jack Lynn.

In 1993, Kulukundis was part of a consortium which took over the struggling Duke of York's Theatre on St Martin's Lane. The consortium became the Ambassador Theatre Group, of which Kulukundis was Life President and a major share holder.

Athletics
In November 1998, Kulukundis came second in the contest to become the first elected president of UK Athletics to former Olympic champion David Hemery. Kulukundis served as chairman of the London Coaching Foundation, the Midland Coaching Foundation and Athletes Youth Performance; vice-president of UK Athletics; chairman of the British Athletic Field Event Charitable Trust; and as chairman and patron of the Belgrave Harriers athletics club.

Philanthropy
Kulukundis gave more than £2 million to British athletes over 25 years. It was estimated that Kulukundis supported about 60 to 70 athletes.

The philanthropy started when he returned to the UK, after a chance meeting with David Hemery. Through Harry Wilson, Steve Ovett's coach, Kulukundis received the names of several athletes who needed help. Every deal was recorded by his secretary because, theoretically, each one was only a loan. Among the athletes Kulukundis has supported were:

Nick Buckfield
Linford Christie
Sally Gunnell
Denise Lewis
Steve Ovett
Fatima Whitbread
Janine Whitlock
Du'aine Ladejo
Roger Black – "'When I was out of action for two years and earning nothing, it was Eddie who helped me with my mortgage."
Dwain Chambers – who had to move out of home, so Kulukundis funded his flat
David Jenkins – the disgraced 400m runner returned the $800 lent to him in 1978, when Kulukundis visited Indianapolis in 1998 for the US trials
Dean Macey – Kulukundis provided Macey with an inexhaustible supply of free motor transport; Macey returned what remained of the car a few months later. On one occasion, the timelag between provision and destruction was no more than an afternoon. After three crashes, Macey gave up and Kulukundis funded his warm winter training instead.
Eugene Gilkes "It was Eddie's support that made it possible for me to continue through the trials and tribulations of injury for long enough to hobble to a Commonwealth Decathlon medal. And so many of the good things in life that have happened since have been as a direct result of this achievement. I will always be grateful"
Mo Farah - Kulukundis paid the legal costs of Farah's naturalisation as a British citizen to ensure he could pursue his international career.
Brendan Reilly - "Eddie opened my eyes to more than sport. Through his generosity and kindness I experienced theatre, travel and developed lifelong friendships".

Personal life
Kulukundis married the English actress Susan Hampshire in 1981. The couple lived on the outskirts of Bedford, England. Active on stage and screen until her early seventies, Hampshire gave up most acting opportunities after 2009 to care for her husband, who had developed dementia and type 2 diabetes. Kulukundis died at his home on 17 February 2021, aged 88.

Honours
Kulukundis was appointed Officer of the Order of the British Empire (OBE) for services to Sport in the 1988 Birthday Honours, and knighted for charitable services to Sport and to the Arts in the 1993 Birthday Honours.

References

1932 births
2021 deaths
20th-century English businesspeople
British businesspeople in shipping
Businesspeople from London
English people of Greek descent
English philanthropists
English theatre managers and producers
Knights Bachelor
Officers of the Order of the British Empire
People from Westminster
Sports patrons